|}

The Arkle Challenge Trophy is a Grade 1 National Hunt steeplechase in Great Britain which is open to horses aged five years or older. It is run on the Old Course at Cheltenham, England, over a distance of about 2 miles (1 mile, 7 furlongs and 199 yards, or ), and during its running there are thirteen fences to be jumped. The race is for novice chasers, and takes place each year during the Cheltenham Festival in March.

It is the leading minimum-distance chase for novices in the National Hunt calendar. It is the second race on the opening day of the festival.

History
The Arkle Challenge Trophy was introduced as a replacement for the Cotswold Chase, a previous event at the Cheltenham Festival, in 1969. Its title pays tribute to Arkle, a three-time winner of the Cheltenham Gold Cup in the mid-1960s. The race was formerly scheduled to be run on the second day of the Festival, but it was switched to its slot on the opening day in 1980.

The first sponsor of the "Arkle" was Waterford Castle, which began supporting the event in 1991. It was backed by Guinness from 1994 to 1999, and from 2000 to 2011 it was sponsored by the Irish Independent newspaper. The Racing Post newspaper sponsored the race from 2012 to 2020. From 2021 the race is sponsored by Sporting Life.

Several winners of the race have subsequently achieved victory in the most prestigious two-mile chase in the National Hunt calendar, the Queen Mother Champion Chase. The most recent was Put The Kettle On, the winner of the latter event in 2021. The 1978 winner, Alverton, went on to win the following season's Cheltenham Gold Cup.

In 2020, Put the Kettle On become the first Mare to win the race since Anaglogs Daughter in 1980.

Records
Leading jockey since 1946 (4 wins):
 Barry Geraghty – Moscow Flyer (2002), Forpadydeplasterer (2009), Sprinter Sacre (2012), Simonsig (2013)
 Ruby Walsh – Azertyuiop (2003), Un de Sceaux (2015), Douvan (2016), Footpad (2018)

Leading trainer since 1946 (7 wins):
 Nicky Henderson – Remittance Man (1991), Travado (1993), Tiutchev (2000), Sprinter Sacre (2012), Simonsig (2013), Altior (2017), Shishkin (2021)

Winners since 1946

See also
 Horse racing in Great Britain
 List of British National Hunt races

References

 Racing Post:

 cheltenham.co.uk – Media information pack (2010).
 pedigreequery.com – Arkle Challenge Trophy Chase – Cheltenham.

External links
 Race Recordings 

National Hunt races in Great Britain
Cheltenham Racecourse
National Hunt chases